Innocent Sousa (1879-1962) was a Bombay-based poet and writer of Goan origin, who wrote in the English language and got his work published in the early 20th century. He is mentioned in The Golden Treasury of Indo-Anglian Poetry: 1828-1965 and listed, early on among Indian writers in English, in the books-received section of the 1912-founded Poetry journal.

Current recognition
A hundred years later, mention of his work can still be found in cyberspace, though the actual texts are not easily accessible. The poet has also not been adequately understood in his own home-state of Goa.

Both prose and poetry

Innocent Sousa has been listed under both the prose as well as the poetry sections in a study conducted by the  University Libraries University of Washington Research Guide on South Asian literature in English for the Pre-Independence period.. This was undertaken  initially compiled by Irene Joshi.

In global listing

Sousa is said to have been listed among the top 500 living poets of the world in a book published by Mitre Press, London in 1932, titled Principal Poets of the World Volume I [1] 1930-31.

Other publications

His other publications include:

 Radha: a romance, and other Indian tales. Bombay: Taraporevala, 1904. 113 p.;
 Radha, a Hindu belle. Bombay: New Book Co., 1939. 151 p.; Rev. ed. of Radha, a romance.
 The Clarks, and other post office tales. Bombay: n.p., 1923.
 Uncle Roland: or looking for a wife. Bombay: Taraporevala, 1906. 156 p.
 Beautiful Bombay and other story poems. Bombay: New Book Co., 1938. 56 p.
 The maid of the hill. London: A.H. Stockwell, 1929.
 The Fascination of the Dance, and Other Tales. Bombay: Taraporewala
 A Guide to Goa, with a brief history of Goa, and the Life of St. Francis Xavier. Bombay: Hosang T. Anklesaria.
 Twixt Night and Morn. London: Drane, London
 Included in anthologies: The Spring Anthology, 1930 (The Mitre Press).

Work mentioned
Five of Innocent Sousa's books are mentioned on amazon.co.uk, but with the mention that the books "are not currently available".

References

External links
 Online links to work.

Poets from Bombay Presidency
20th-century Indian poets
1879 births
1962 deaths
Writers from Mumbai
Goan people
Poets in British India